The North American ice storm of January 1961 was a massive ice storm that struck areas of the Idaho Panhandle in the United States on January 1–3, 1961. The storm set a record for thickest recorded ice accumulation from a single storm in the United States, at eight inches.

The storm's swath covered areas from Grangeville, Idaho, to the Canada–United States border. According to the National Weather Service, a combination of dense fog, sub-freezing temperatures, and occasional freezing rain led to the heavy ice accretions. Catastrophic damage to trees and utilities resulted in widespread power outages.

Prior to the storm, previous records of between four and six inches of ice were recorded in New York City and Texas.

References

1961 meteorology
1961 in Idaho
1961
Natural disasters in Idaho
1961 natural disasters in the United States
January 1961 events in North America